Emiliano Tortolano (born 22 May 1990) is an Italian professional football player who plays for Pomezia in the fifth-tier Eccellenza.

Career
Ahead of the 2019–20 season, Tortolano joined Ostia Mare.

References

External links
 
 

1990 births
Living people
Italian footballers
A.S.D. Olimpia Colligiana players
Latina Calcio 1932 players
A.S.D. Sorrento players
Cosenza Calcio players
U.S. Pergolettese 1932 players
U.S. Catanzaro 1929 players
A.S. Melfi players
A.S. Sambenedettese players
U.S. Viterbese 1908 players
Serie B players
Serie C players
Serie D players
Association football midfielders